The CONCACAF Under-15 Championship was a scheduled a youth association football competition, the first edition of the CONCACAF Under-15 Championship. It took place 13–25 August 2013. The competition was hosted on Grand Cayman Island.

Each match lasted 70 minutes.

Participants

Venues

Group stage

Tiebreakers

The following tiebreaking criteria were established by CONCACAF:
Greatest number of points obtained in all group matches
Goal difference in all group matches
Greatest number of goals scored in all group matches
Greatest number of points obtained in matches amongst teams still tied
Lots drawn by the Gold Cup Organizing Committee

Group A

Group B

Group C

Group D

Knockout stage

Semi-finals

Third place playoff

Finals

Player awards 

Golden boot
 Leighton Thomas Jr.
Golden glove 
 Wilmer Martinez
Most valuable player
 Darixon Vuelto

References

External links
 2013 CONCACAF Under-15 Championship technical report

2013
Girls' U-15 Championship
International association football competitions hosted by Cayman Islands
2013–14 in Caymanian football